Murray is a populated place in Young County, Texas. It is centered on the intersection of Farm to Market Roads 209 and 578. It had a population of 45 as of the 2000 census.

References 

Unincorporated communities in Young County, Texas
Unincorporated communities in Texas